Vashgird (Russian and Tajik: Вашгирд) is a jamoat in Tajikistan. It is located in Fayzobod District, one of the Districts of Republican Subordination. The jamoat has a total population of 5,509 (2015).

References

Populated places in Districts of Republican Subordination
Jamoats of Tajikistan